Chemsakiella virgulata is a species of beetle in the family Cerambycidae. It was described by Chemsak in 1987.

References

Trachyderini
Beetles described in 1987